Rafael van der Laan Teixeira Miranda (born 8 June 1999) is a Portuguese footballer who plays for Casa Pia as a goalkeeper.

Football career
He made his professional debut for Casa Pia on 5 December 2019 in the Taça da Liga.

References

External links

1999 births
Living people
Footballers from Lisbon
Portuguese footballers
Portuguese people of Dutch descent
Association football goalkeepers
Casa Pia A.C. players
Real S.C. players
Liga Portugal 2 players
Campeonato de Portugal (league) players